Arthur J. Audett (April 11, 1858 – April 23, 1921) was an American politician from New York.

Life
Audett was born in  Hamilton, Canada West. He emigrated to the United States in 1876, and settled in Brooklyn in 1884. He was a lithographic transferrer.

Audett was a member of the New York State Assembly in 1895 (Kings Co., 13th D.) and 1896 (Kings Co., 6th D.).

He was a member of the New York State Senate (4th D.) in 1901 and 1902.

He died suddenly on March 23, 1921, at the Adelphia Hotel in Philadelphia, of heart disease.

Sources
 Official New York from Cleveland to Hughes by Charles Elliott Fitch (Hurd Publishing Co., New York and Buffalo, 1911, Vol. IV; pg. 334f and 365)
 Sketches of the members of the Legislature in The Evening Journal Almanac (1895; pg. 56)
 Ex-Senator Audett Dies Suddenly in NYT on April 24, 1921

1858 births
1921 deaths
Republican Party New York (state) state senators
Politicians from Hamilton, Ontario
Republican Party members of the New York State Assembly
Politicians from Brooklyn
Canadian emigrants to the United States